Petit Oiseau is an album by bassist and composer William Parker that was recorded in 2007 and released on the AUM Fidelity label.

Reception

The review for AllMusic stated "Petit Oiseau should be regarded as a triumphant achievement by one of the early 21st century's strongest and most rewarding quartets". PopMatters's review observed "Petit Oiseau follows in a line of great recordings by the quartet, and is unrelenting in its artistic vision. They know how to let each other go out on tangents while knowing the exact time to swing, and swing hard".

All About Jazz said "A welcome return to the studio from one of today's most esteemed working groups, Petit Oiseau is one of Parker's most accessible and enjoyable releases". The JazzTimes review noted "No matter what they do, the William Parker Quartet shows us that avant-garde music doesn’t have to be weird and off-putting. It can even swing".

Personnel
William Parker - bass, cedar flute
Lewis Barnes - trumpet
Rob Brown - alto saxophone, B♭ clarinet 
Hamid Drake - drums, frame drum, balafon

References

2008 albums
AUM Fidelity albums
William Parker (musician) albums